The 2013 Men's International Super Series Hockey 9's was the third and final edition of the men's field hockey tournament. The tournament was held at the Perth Hockey Stadium between 17–20 October 2013 in Perth, Australia. A total of four teams competed for the title.

The tournament was held alongside the women's competition. 

Australia won the tournament by defeating Argentina 9–4 in the final. Malaysia won the bronze medal by defeating Pakistan 2–1 in the third and fourth playoff.

Participating nations
A total of four teams competed for the title:

Officials
The following umpires were appointed by the FIH and Hockey Australia to officiate the tournament:

 Murray Grime (AUS)
 Devendra Patel (NZL)
 Rohizan Ramli (MAS)
 Maximiliano Scala (ARG)
 Kamran Sharif (PAK)

Competition format and rules
The International Super Series Hockey 9's has a unique set of rules varying from standard FIH regulations.

The main variations are as follows:
Matches are played with a maximum of 9 players on the field at any time for each team
Matches are played in 2 halves of 20 minutes
Goals are widened by 1 metre than regulation size

Results

Preliminary round

Fixtures

Classification round

Third and fourth place

Final

Statistics

Final standings

Goalscorers

References

External links
Official website

International field hockey competitions hosted by Australia
2013 in Australian field hockey
2013 in Argentine sport
2013 in Malaysian sport
2013 in field hockey